Thirukkolur (or Thirukalur ) is a village in Thoothukudi district in Tamil Nadu. The village is the location  of the  Sri Vaithamanidhi Perumal Temple.

It is situated 3 kilometres away from Alwarthirunagari. The village is approximately 30 kilometres away from Tirunelveli and approximately 35 kilometres away from Thoothukudi. The coordinates of Thirukkolur are 8.5949° N, 77.9582° E.

Etymology 
According to a Hindu legend, Kubera, the lord of wealth, was once cursed by Shiva for his lustful glance towards Parvati.Kubera soon realized his mistake and repented for his sin, seeking forgiveness from Shiva and Parvathi. They advised him to perform penance at Thirukkolur. After his penance, Vaithamanithi Perumal blessed him with great wealth again. Since it is the place (Tamil : ஊர்) where Kubera got (Tamil : கோள் - கொள்ளுதல்) his wealth (Tamil  : திரு - செல்வம்), the name of this town was Thirukkolaur

Thiru (திரு)  + Kol (கோள்) + Oor (ஊர்) = Thirukkolur  (திருக்கோளூர்)

Geography 
The village is located near to the banks of Thamirabarani river. The South Canal of Srivaikuntam dam passes through this village.

Agriculture 
Due to availability of water resources and fertile land, agriculture is widely practiced. Crops such as Paddy, Urad dal, Groundnut, and Banana are cultivated.

Administration

Religious places 

Vaithamanidhi Perumal Temple is one among 108 Divya Desams and 9 Nava Tirupathis. The deity of the temple is Sri Vaithamanidhi Perumal (Vishnu). The deity is in reclining pose.

Madhurakavi Alwar 
Thirukkolur is the birthplace of Madurakavi Alwar, who is one among 12 Alwars. Madurakavi Alwar was a disciple of Nammalvar

Excavations 
The central government has given permission to carry out excavations at 5 places near Adichanallur including Thirukkolur to find the habitats of the ancient people. On 5 February 2023, Archeological Survey of India commenced excavation near Chera Chola Pandeeswarar Temple at Thirukkolur. Later, the archaeologists said that they are planning to expand the excavation and the excavation work will continue for one year.

Transportation

Road 
There is a main road which passes through Thirukkolur. This road starts from Maanattur in SH- 93 ( Alwar Thirunagari - Valliyur Highway) and ends at Palkulam Vilakku in SH - 40 ( Sengottai - Tiruchendur highway ).

Railway 
The nearest railway stations are Alwar Thirunagari  (3 kilometres) and Nazareth  (6 kilometres). Daily passenger trains from Tiruchendur, Thoothukudi and Tirunelveli halt in these stations. The only express train, which halts in Nazareth, is the Chendur Express.

The nearest important railway station is Tirunelveli Junction (35 kilometres).

Air 
The nearest airports are

 Tuticorin Airport ( 25 kilometres )
 Trivandrum international airport ( approximately 170 kilometres ) and
 Madurai Airport ( approximately 170 kilometres)

See also 

 Vaithamanidhi Perumal Temple
 Alwarthirunagari
 Mela Vellamadam

References 

Villages in Thoothukudi district